Sci Fi Investigates is a six episode reality television series featuring skeptic Rob Mariano, forensic specialist Deborah Dobrydney, archaeologist Bill Doleman, and paranormal investigator Richard Dolan, as they look at paranormal and supernatural phenomenon and try to explain them. The show debuted in October 2006 on the American SyFy channel (formerly Sci-Fi Channel) following Ghost Hunters. There have also been two webisodes.

Episode format
The series documents a team of four paranormal investigators who travel to various locations around the United States and investigate various urban legends.

The team uses various research methods to gather as much information as they can about the particular legend or phenomena an episode focuses on. They meet with local residents, listen to eye-witness reports, study documentation, conduct forensic experiments on physical evidence, and conduct on-location archaeological studies. At the end they review and discuss their findings and each investigator gives their opinions from different points-of-view.

Each episode is an hour long, including commercials.

Criticism
The Cryptomundo blog by Mothman researcher Loren Coleman is an indepth criticism of the October 26, 2006, "Sci-fi Investigates" broadcast's "Mothman" episode. Coleman wrote that while it had a few moments that are pure entertainment and certainly funny, it had little or nothing to do with "investigating" Mothman or unexplained phenomena.

Credited cast
Deborah Dobrydney – Dobrydney is a forensics specialist with a B.S. in psychology and a B.A. in Spanish studies both from Fordham University in New York and is a graduate of the Masters of Science program from the University of New Haven. She has worked for a crime scene investigation unit since 2002.
Richard M. Dolan – Dolan is a paranormal investigator and author of two volumes entitled UFOs and the National Security State. Prior to his interest in UFOs, he studied Cold War history, tactics and diplomacy. He has a master's degree in history from the University of Rochester and a bachelor's degree in history from Alfred University. He earned a certificate in political theory from Oxford University and was a Rhodes Scholar finalist. Dolan has also appeared in numerous paranormal documentaries over the years including Sci-Fi Channel's UFO Invasion at Rendlesham documentary.
Bill Doleman – Dr. Doleman is an archaeologist. He was also the chief investigator of a Roswell, New Mexico evidence dig conducted by the University of New Mexico and documented in the 2003 documentary The Roswell Crash: Startling New Evidence, which was hosted by Bryant Gumbel and also produced by the Sci-Fi Channel. Doleman is a 1995 graduate of UNM with a Ph.D. in anthropology. In 2004, Doleman became director of New Mexico's archaeological archive and database (a.k.a. ARMS).
Rob Mariano – An adventurer, Rob Mariano was also the former competitor "Boston Rob" to fans of Survivor: Marquesas, Survivor: All-Stars and The Amazing Race. He is the skeptic of the investigative team.
Lisa Van Camp – Van Camp is a forensic analyst (appeared in "Roswell" and "Paranormal Hotspots" episodes, filling in for Dobrydney)

Episodes

Specials
Highway to Hell: The Legends of Clinton Road (SciFi.com Webisode in five parts) – Deborah and Richard investigate local ghost stories of Clinton Road in West Milford, NJ.

See also
 The X Creatures – a similar BBC series
 Destination Truth
 Ghost Hunters

External links
Sci Fi Investigates
 Cryptomundo blog on Sci Fi Investigates' Mothman

Paranormal television
Syfy original programming
2000s American reality television series
2006 American television series debuts
2006 American television series endings